Kokkosaari is the largest island in a lake on an island in a lake in the world.  It is located in Kuonanjärvi on the Sääminginsalo island, which has been claimed to be the largest island in Finland. Kokkosaari is almost 2000 m long, with a width of 400-900 m.

Uninhabited islands of Finland
Lake islands of Finland